Road to UFC: Japan is an American reality television series and Ultimate Fighting Championship (UFC) mixed martial arts (MMA) competition. 
It is the inaugural event "Road to UFC" event and the event featured eight Japanese featherweight fighters with former champion Josh Barnett and Roy Nelson as coaches. The show started on July 6, 2015 and the finale aired on September 27, 2015 at UFC Fight Night: Barnett vs. Nelson.

Background 
It is the inaugural  "Road to UFC" event and it started from July 6, 2015 and ended on September 27, 2015 at UFC Fight Night: Barnett vs. Nelson. The show was slightly different from The Ultimate Fighter in that participants did not share a house but trained in their home towns and in Las Vegas at the UFC Gym under the supervision of coaches of Roy Nelson and Josh Barnett.

Cast

Coaches and Trainers

Team Nelson's 
Mizuto Hirota 
Akiyo Nishiura
Tatsunao Nagakura
Nobumitsu Osawa

Team Barnett's 
Daiki Hata
Teruto Ishihara
Tatsuya Ando
Hiroyuki Oshiro

Tournament Bracket

The final of the bout was between Mizuto Hirota and Teruto Ishihara. The fight ended in split daw and both fighters were awarded the UFC contracts.

Coaches' Fight

UFC Fight Night: Barnett vs. Nelson was held  on September 27, 2015, at Saitama Super Arena in Saitama, Japan.

Heavyweight bout:  Josh Barnett vs. Roy NelsonBarnett''' defeated Nelson via unanimous decision.

See also
 Ultimate Fighting Championship
 Road to UFC

References

2015 American television seasons
2015 in mixed martial arts
Ultimate Fighting Championship
Mixed martial arts events